"Sun Burns Down" is a digital single by Japanese singer-songwriter Jin Akanishi, released on January 24, 2012.

Background
Prior to the single release, on January 6, 2012 was held a sold-out concert at 12,000 seat Yokohama Arena, which was streamed live at the Grammy Museum. It was followed by the release of debut studio album Japonicana in March 2012.

Release
The single was made available digitally through all digital retailers and streaming services from January 24, and its music video premiered on January 20 on YouTube. It was produced by The Stereotypes.

Chart performance
The single was released by Warner Music Japan, and in the first week debuted at number twenty-three on Billboard Japan Hot 100, and the successive week peaked at number nineteen. On the Billboard Japan Top Airplay peaked at number seven. In American Billboard charts it peaked at number one on Hot Singles Sales, and on Dance Singles Sales, while number thirty-five on Hot Dance Club Songs chart.

Track listing

Charts

References

External links
Sun Burns Down on iTunes

2012 singles
2012 songs
Jin Akanishi songs
Warner Music Group singles
Songs written by Jin Akanishi